Bishnu Bahadur Singh is a Nepalese Olympic boxer. He represented his country in the flyweight division at the 1988 Summer Olympics. He won his first fight against Sixto Vera, but lost his second bout against Arthur Johnson (boxer).

1988 Olympic results
Below is the record of Bishnu Bahadur Singh, a flyweight boxer who competed for Nepal at the 1988 Seoul Olympics

 Round of 64: defeated Sixto Vera (Paraguay) by decision, 5-0
 Round of 32: lost to Arthur Johnson (United States) referee stopped contest in second round

References

External links
 

1969 births
Living people
Nepalese male boxers
Olympic boxers of Nepal
Boxers at the 1988 Summer Olympics
Boxers at the 1994 Asian Games
Asian Games competitors for Nepal
Flyweight boxers